Self Help Africa is an international charity that promotes and implements long-term rural development projects in Africa. Self Help Africa merged with Gorta in July 2014, and in 2021 merged with UK-based INGO, United Purpose.  The organisation also owns a number of social enterprise subsidiaries - Cumo Microfinance, TruTrade and Partner Africa.  

Self Help Africa works with rural communities in fifteen African countries – supporting farm families to grow more and earn more from their produce. Self Help Africa provides training and technical support to assist households to produce more food, diversify their crops and incomes, and access markets for their surplus produce. The organisation also implements development projects in Bangladesh and Brazil.

The agency also helps rural communities to access micro-finance services, and supports sustainable agricultural solutions that enable rural farmers to adapt and mitigate the effects of climate change. Self Help Africa works with local partners across its African programmes to support the provision of good quality local seed and planting materials. This work includes assistance to local communities to multiply their own seed, and provision of support for rural groups so that they can get certification for the seed that they produce.

The organisation has its headquarters in Dublin, Ireland, UK offices in Shrewsbury, Belfast, London and American offices in New York and Boston. Self Help Africa is a recipient of funding from Irish Aid, the European Commission, US AID, the United Kingdom Department of Foreign and Overseas Development (DFID), of variety of trusts, foundations, other institutional donors, and the general public. It has three subsidiary companies, an ethical auditing provider, and two trade network promoters.

Programmes in Africa 
Self Help Africa collaborates with government agencies and local partner non-governmental organisations (NGOs) on programmes in Ethiopia, Malawi, Kenya, Uganda, Zambia, Togo and Burkina Faso. It has a presence in Goma in Eastern Democratic Republic of Congo and in Bujumbura, Burundi from where it runs a number of agri-trade development projects. It has also worked in Eritrea, Ghana and Benin.

Other projects carried out by Self Help Africa include a cassava development project in Kenya that was backed by the European Union, and two challenge funds – AgriFI Kenya Challenge Fund and ENTERPRISE Zambia, which provided investment match-funding to agri-businesses in these two countries. AgriFI Kenya, backed by the European Union and Slovak Aid, was funded to disburse €18M in funding to create jobs and markets for small-holder farmers, while ENTERPRISE Zambia was backed by the EU to disburse €24M in grant funding.

Self Help Africa are founder members of the Irish Forum for International Agricultural Development (IFIAD). Its members include the Irish farm advisory service Teagasc, the Irish Department of Agriculture, Irish Farmers Association and other NGOs.

A subsidiary of Self Help Africa, Partner Africa based in Nairobi, Kenya, was established in 2012 to support ethical and socially responsible business practice.

History

Formation
Self Help Africa was founded in 1984 when an Irish priest asked Irish farmers to send seed potatoes to famine-impacted parts of Ethiopia.

Farmer and businessman Tom Corcoran, a former chairman of agri-food corporation Glanbia, was appointed chairman of Self Help Development International (SHDI) in 2006.

Self Help Africa was established in mid-2008 following a merger between Self Help Development International (SHDI) and the UK agency Harvest Help - both set up in the wake of African famines in the mid-1980s.

Self Help Africa has won several awards for its website, including an Annual Digital Media Award 'Best Information Web-Site' in 2007.

Expansion and campaigns
In November 2009, Self Help Africa was formally launched in the United States by former Irish President and UN High Commissioner for Human Rights Mary Robinson. Also in 2009, the organisation collaborated with a number of international development agencies including Development Fund of Norway and FARM-Africa to publish 'Climate Frontline - African Communities Adapting to Survive'.

In 2011, a campaign, titled "Change Her Life", was mounted by Self Help Africa that sought to lobby funding agencies and donors to provide support to Africa's women farmers. Also in 2011, a promotional video produced by Self Help Africa, "It starts with a seed", was selected as the Best Video entry in the Gates Foundation's "Answering the Challenge" competition.

In 2012, Self Help Africa were the beneficiaries of a trans-Asian 'Silk Roads to Shanghai' expedition that took Irishmen Maghnus Collins Smyth and David Burns overland across a distance of 18,000 km from Istanbul to Shanghai - by bike, run and raft. The expedition took the participants ten months to complete, and succeeded in raising close to €50,000 to support the charity's work in Africa. Also in 2012-2013, Self Help Africa extended its work to Benin, and established Partner Africa. Self Help Africa was also involved in the creation of the African Agriculture Alliance. Turnover in 2013 grew to €9.5million.

Partnerships
In Summer 2014 Self Help Africa merged with Gorta, the oldest development organisation in Ireland. This merger launched Gorta-Self Help Africa in the Irish market. The organisation continues to operate as Self Help Africa outside Ireland.

Gorta was established by the Department of Agriculture in Ireland in 1965 arising from a UN-led international Freedom from Hunger campaign. The merger of Gorta and Self Help Africa was intended to enable the organisation to increase its turnover in 2014 from a projected €14m up to €19m.

Mid-2010s
In 2015, Self Help Africa increased its turnover to more than €18m, and launched several agriculture and enterprise development activities in Kenya, Ethiopia, and West Africa.

Tom Kitt, a former government minister and former Minister for Overseas Development succeeded co-chairs Tom Corcoran and Sean Gaule at the helm of the organisation.

Also in 2015, Self Help Africa secured $750,000 from The Bill & Melinda Gates Foundation for a development project in West Africa. During the year the organisation also co-authored a report by NGOs in Ireland on the application of climate smart agriculture techniques in Africa. An opinion editorial on the importance of a global deal on climate change at COP21 authored by CEO Ray Jordan was published in an Irish national newspaper.

In 2016, Self Help Africa increased its turnover to more than €18.7m.

In 2017, Self Help Africa increased its turnover to more than €20m, and launched a series of new projects, in Kenya, Uganda and Malawi. Support of close to €40m was awarded from the European Union for BETTER, Malawi, a consortium project designed to create more than 13,700 community-based farmer training sites in the southern African country, and for KILIMO-VC, a project designed to boost agri-enterprise development in Kenya.

A multi-media story-telling project, won a national award from Ireland's NGO representative body Dochas for its accounts of the lives of people living in Northern Zambia over a period of years.

Meanwhile, a cashless trading platform designed for farmers in sub-Saharan Africa, and developed by Self Help Africa subsidiary social enterprise TruTrade received an innovation award from MIT.
In 2017, Self Help Africa also took over the operations of Irish-based trade development NGO, Traidlinks which has been involved in supporting trade development opportunities for agri-businesses in Rwanda, Burundi and Democratic Republic of the Congo.

Late 2010s
Self Help Africa launched a number of agriculture and enterprise development projects in 2018. These included an agricultural training project in Uganda to enable farming families to produce and sell their grain to the UN World Food Programme and a maize development project backed by US Aid in Ethiopia.

In 2018, Self Help Africa's social enterprise subsidiary won the annual Dóchas award for innovation, while its annual report was short-listed at the Ireland Good Governance Awards and by the Leinster Institute of Chartered Accountants.

Self Help Africa also concluded a merger with "War on Want Northern Ireland" in 2018, and formally launched a new branch – Self Help Africa NI at City Hall, Belfast, in March 2018.

The president of the Irish Farmers' Association, Joe Healy, visited Self Help Africa projects in Ethiopia and Kenya and reaffirmed Self Help Africa as the chosen charity of the IFA.

Self Help Africa spent 94% of funds on programs, 4.5% on fundraising and 1.5% on governance in 2019. The programme spent in 2019 were Ethiopia 8%, West Africa 6%, Uganda 11%, Malawi 23%, Kenya 20% and others 23%.

2020

Self Help Africa responded to the coronavirus pandemic by providing personal protective equipment to vulnerable communities in several project countries during 2020. In Spring, the organisation embarked on a public campaign to plant 'One Million Trees' in Africa during the year. Supported by yogurt brand Glenisk, the campaign was also supported by the Irish National Teachers Organisation (INTO) and by the Gaelic Athletic Association's Gaelic Players Association (GPA).

In Autumn 2020 Self Help Africa was one of the six founding member agencies of the Irish humanitarian response consortium the Irish Emergency Alliance which ran its first campaign to support communities in the Global South vulnerable to the pandemic.

2021
In 2021, United Purpose merged with Self Help Africa. The combined organisation plans to work in a total of 17 countries and support more than five million people.

References

Development charities based in the Republic of Ireland
International development in Africa